Westhofen is a former Verbandsgemeinde ("collective municipality") in the district Alzey-Worms, Rhineland-Palatinate, Germany. The seat of the Verbandsgemeinde was in Westhofen. On 1 July 2014 it merged into the new Verbandsgemeinde Wonnegau.

The Verbandsgemeinde Westhofen consisted of the following Ortsgemeinden ("local municipalities"):

 Bechtheim
 Bermersheim
 Dittelsheim-Heßloch
 Frettenheim
 Gundersheim
 Gundheim
 Hangen-Weisheim
 Hochborn
 Monzernheim
 Westhofen

Former Verbandsgemeinden in Rhineland-Palatinate